Ricketwil is a quarter and a hamlet with 91 inhabitants (2007) in the district 2 of Winterthur.

It was formerly a part of Oberwinterthur municipality, which was incorporated into Winterthur in 1922.

Winterthur